The European Conservatives and Reformists (ECR) is a soft Eurosceptic, anti-federalist political group of the European Parliament. The ECR is the parliamentary group of the European Conservatives and Reformists Party (ECR Party) European political party (formerly known as the Alliance of Conservatives and Reformists in Europe (2016–2019) or Alliance of European Conservatives and Reformists (2009–2016), but also includes MEPs from four other European parties and thirteen MEPs without European party affiliation.

Ideologically, the group is broadly eurosceptic, anti-federalist and right-wing. The main objective of the ECR is to oppose unchecked European integration, enlargement and potential evolution of the European Union (EU) into a Federal European Superstate on the basis of Eurorealism, and to ensure the EU does not heavily encroach on matters of state and domestic and regional decision making within EU member countries. It also advocates for free market policies and stricter controls on immigration. The ECR contains factions of socially conservative, right-wing populist, liberal conservative, Christian democrat, and national conservative parties who all subscribe to an anti-federalist and eurorealist or euro-critical stance. Within the ECR, some parties and MEPs promote soft euroscepticism, (as opposed to a total rejection of the existence of the EU characterized by anti-EU-ism or hard euroscepticism), by calling for democratic reform of the EU, more transparency, changes to the Eurozone and EU migration/asylum policies, and the curbing some of the EU's powers and bureaucracy whilst maintaining unrestricted free trade and cooperation between nations. Other parties and individual MEPs within the group support complete withdrawal from the block, referendums on EU membership and opposition to the Eurozone.

The ECR was founded around the Movement for European Reform after the 2009 European elections at the behest of British Conservative Party leader David Cameron. Currently it is the sixth-largest group in the European Parliament with 62 MEPs from 16 countries.

Presently, the largest party in the group by number of MEPs is the Law and Justice (PiS) of Poland.

Founding principles and ideology

The genesis of the ECR dates back to 2005, and possibly earlier. A political group in the European Parliament cannot be officially recognised if it contains MEPs from only a single member state. Instead, it must meet the minimum threshold required by the European Parliament's Rules of Procedure. Any party seeking to create a group must therefore seek partners. The last mixed group in the European Parliament was forcibly dissolved. Since then, groups have been required to demonstrate ideological coherence. This is usually done by publishing a document (sometimes called a constituent declaration) stating the principles to which each group member is expected to adhere. The constituent declaration of the ECR has become known as the Prague Declaration. That document outlines the following principles:
 Free enterprise, free and fair trade and competition, minimal regulation, lower taxation, and small government as the ultimate catalysts for individual freedom and personal and national prosperity.
 Freedom of the individual, more personal responsibility and greater democratic accountability.
 Sustainable, clean energy supply with an emphasis on energy security.
 The importance of the family as the bedrock of society.
 The sovereign integrity of the nation state, opposition to EU federalism and a renewed respect for true subsidiarity.
 The over-riding value of the transatlantic security relationship in a revitalised NATO, and support for young democracies across Europe.
 Effectively controlled immigration and an end to abuse of asylum procedures
 Efficient and modern public services and sensitivity to the needs of both rural and urban communities.
 An end to waste and excessive bureaucracy and a commitment to greater transparency and probity in the EU institutions and use of EU funds.
 Respect and equitable treatment for all EU countries, new and old, large and small.

Ideologically, the founder members of the ECR traditionally sat on the centre-right to right-wing of the political spectrum with an economically liberal and anti-federalist outlook and an initial reluctance from the Conservative Party to include hardline anti-immigration and ultra-nationalist parties. Like the centre-right European People's Party (EPP), the founding members of the ECR mostly support pro-free market ideas with some of its MEPs maintaining ties to think-tanks such as the Cobden Centre and Open Europe, as opposed to the more economic nationalist and anti-globalization approach of other euro-critical groups such as the EFDD and Identity and Democracy. However, the EPP generally favours EU integration and enlargement whereas the ECR opposes it.

In recent years the group has come to contain a growing faction of nationalist, anti-immigration and right-wing populist movements, with some former ECR members arguing that the group has shifted considerably further to the right over time.

The shift to the right was increased following the withdrawal of the United Kingdom from the European Union, since the Conservative Party lost its representation in the European Parliament.

In a statement issued on 11 November 2021, two core political documents were cited by the Group's Co-Chairmen, Ryszard Legutko and Raffaele Fitto, to define the ECR's ideological basis when they reaffirmed the Group's "commitment to the Prague Declaration and the ECR Statement on the Reform of the European Union".

History

Origins: 2005–06
In 2005, the British Conservative Party held a leadership contest. During the sixth term of the European Parliament, Conservative Party MEPs sat in the European Democrats (ED), a subgroup of the European People's Party–European Democrats (EPP-ED) group, which is dominated by the European People's Party (EPP). Leadership contender David Cameron argued for withdrawal of the Conservatives from EPP-ED and the formation of a new group. Upon taking office as Conservative leader in December 2005, Cameron indicated that the launch of a new group would be undertaken immediately. The motives for forming this group was the EPP-ED was too federalist, while the Tories opposed stronger European integration.

In June 2006, Cameron ordered Shadow Foreign Secretary William Hague to ensure the new group was created by 13 July 2006. However, when that date arrived, it was announced that the launch of the new European Parliament group was delayed until after the 2009 elections.

Movement for European Reform

In the interim, a pan-European alliance, called the Movement for European Reform (MER), was founded and functioned outside of the European Parliament. The same day, the Law and Justice and Civic Platform parties of Poland were identified as potential members of the new group: However, Civic Platform stated that it would not leave the EPP, and the Law and Justice stated that it planned to stay aligned to UEN. The next day, Sir Reg Empey, the leader of the Ulster Unionist Party (UUP), suggested that the UUP could join the new group after the 2009 election. In the event of the election, the UUP ran under the banner of the Ulster Conservatives and Unionists, an electoral alliance between the Conservative Party and the Ulster Unionists.

The Czech Civic Democratic Party (ODS) was part of MER but its leader, Mirek Topolánek, did not rule out staying in EPP-ED. Topolánek then attended the EPP Summit (a meeting of heads of state and government of the European People's Party) of 21 June 2007, adding speculation about the fragility of the new group.

Later in 2007, the relations between the EPP and the Conservative Party further deteriorated when the EPP voiced its opposition to the UK holding a referendum of the Treaty of Lisbon, something the Tories had campaigned for.

In July 2008, the European Parliament raised the 2009 threshold for forming a group to 25 members and representing 7 member states. Topolánek, after being re-elected Leader of the ODS on 7 December 2008, attended yet another EPP Summit, on 11 December 2008.

2009 European Parliament elections
As the 2009 European elections approached, Cameron, Topolánek, and Conservative MEP Geoffrey Van Orden (a 'point-man' for the new group) were looking for partners. The list of possible partners was kept secret.

People or parties that were rumoured to be possible partners in the new group included Law and Justice; Lega Nord; the Danish People's Party; For Fatherland and Freedom, Order and Justice, the Pensioners' Party; Order, Law and Justice; Libertas; Civic Union; Electoral Action of Poles in Lithuania, ChristianUnion-SGP; the independent Indrek Tarand; and Lijst Dedecker's Derk Jan Eppink; from member states such as the Czech Republic, Poland, Italy, Sweden, the Baltic and Balkan states, Belgium, and the Netherlands. Speculation also considered the remnants of the Union for Europe of the Nations (UEN) group, which was thought to be on the verge of collapse after the decision of Fianna Fáil to join the Alliance of Liberals and Democrats for Europe (ALDE) and the Italian National Alliance merging with EPP member party Forza Italia. Lajos Bokros, elected on the list of the Hungarian Democratic Forum (MDF) joined the group as the EPP did not want to accept him on pressure of the rival Fidesz.

The new group was provisionally named the European Conservatives, (echoing the 1970s group of the same name), which was then changed to European Conservatives and Reformists. The original estimates were firmed up to 84 MEPs, then to approximately 60. Frictions surfaced, as the ODS wanted the new group to have as many MEPs as possible, whilst the Conservatives wanted to disbar anti-immigrant parties in the new group, including the Danish People's Party and Lega Nord.

Formation

On 22 June 2009, the first official list of the new group's members was released. On 24 June, the group held its inaugural meeting, in which Conservative MEP Timothy Kirkhope was named interim leader. Adam Bielan of PiS and Jan Zahradil of the ODS were named interim vice-chairmen.

At the first sitting of the Seventh European Parliament, on 14 July 2009, outgoing Parliament President Hans-Gert Pöttering announced that applications from all new and returning groups had been received and approved, including ECR. The group then became eligible for EU funding, office space, and committee places.

The first election for the group leadership was also scheduled for 14 July 2009, pitting interim leader Kirkhope against fellow Briton Geoffrey Van Orden. However, both Conservative leadership candidates were forced to forfeit the leadership to prevent it from falling apart, when Conservative MEP Edward McMillan-Scott defied his party whip and stood for one of the vice-presidency posts despite pledges the previous week that Polish MEP Michał Kamiński would be backed for it. Kamiński's bid for Vice-President of the European Parliament subsequently failed, and the Polish MEPs threatened to abandon the new caucus unless Kamiński was made the group leader in the parliament. Kirkhope went to an emergency meeting with Polish MEPs in Strasbourg and proposed sharing the group leadership with the Kamiński; however, this was not accepted, and he had to step down as coalition leader, withdrawing in favour of Kamiński. McMillan-Scott, who alleged that the Conservative's new allies in Poland are 'racist and homophobic', had the Conservative whip withdrawn in the European Parliament. In March 2010, McMillan-Scott joined the British Liberal Democrats and the ALDE group.

Leadership changes and upheavals in membership
Group chairman Kamiński left Law and Justice (PiS) in November 2010, saying that the party had been taken over by the far-right. Kamiński and other Law and Justice MPs and MEPs formed a new Polish party, Poland Comes First, formed as a breakaway from Law and Justice following dissatisfaction with the direction and leadership of Jarosław Kaczyński. Kamiński initially remained chairman of the group, but other Law and Justice MEPs argued he should step down. On 15 December, rumours emerged that the eleven remaining PiS MEPs might leave the ECR and join the right-wing Europe of Freedom and Democracy (EFD) group instead.

In February 2011, Kamiński announced he would resign his chairmanship, effective 8 March, when a replacement would be elected. Former interim leader Timothy Kirkhope was said to be the front runner, but lost the election to Jan Zahradil of the Czech Republic's ODS. Zahradil has been in talks with other parties about joining the ECR. In late March, David Cameron invited the New Flemish Alliance (N-VA) to join the group.

The May 2011 resignation of Silvana Koch-Mehrin, one of the fourteen Vice-Presidents of the European Parliament, led to the ECR considering putting another candidate forward to take the position they were denied through McMillan-Scott's defection. Conservative Party MEP Giles Chichester was nominated on 31 May, and was elected unopposed by the Parliament on 5 July 2011, after the ALDE group to which Koch-Mehrin belongs failed to find a willing and suitable candidate.

On 14 December 2011, a new leadership was elected, with Martin Callanan as chairman and Jan Zahradil, Geoffrey Van Orden, Ryszard Legutko, and Derk Jan Eppink as Vice-Chairmen. On 26 December 2011, four members of United Poland – who had split from Law and Justice in November – left the ECR to join the Europe of Freedom and Democracy (EFD) group. On 17 January 2012, Czech Oldřich Vlasák replaced Chichester as the ECR's Vice-President of the Parliament.

2014 European Parliament elections

The 2014 European elections were held on 22–25 May 2014. On 4 June 2014, the ECR accepted applications from the Danish People's Party (4 MEPs) and the Finns Party (2 MEPs), both formerly attached to the EFD group during the 7th term of the European Parliament, as well as the Family Party of Germany, both Ordinary People and Independent Personalities (OĽaNO) and New Majority (NOVA) from Slovakia, and the Independent Greeks. Alternative for Germany and Bulgaria Without Censorship were admitted on 8 June, followed by the Dutch Reformed Political Party on 16 June. On 18 June the New Flemish Alliance (N-VA) joined the group, a party previously attached to the Greens/EFA group. N-VA party members had voted by a wide margin to join the ECR group instead of ALDE; 70 voted to join the ECR, and just three to join ALDE. The N-VA's decision allowed the ECR to overtake ALDE as the third biggest group in the European parliament, assuming the role of "kingmakers" in the new parliament. On 23 June, Irish Fianna Fáil MEP Brian Crowley joined from the ALDE group, but without the permission of his party or its leader Micheál Martin, who removed Crowley's party whip the following day. On the same day, IMRO – Bulgarian National Movement joined, taking the group to 70 MEPs.

The ECR's unanimous decision to admit the Danish People's Party and Finns Party as members was criticised because one MEP from each party has a criminal conviction. Morten Messerschmidt, lead candidate for the Danish People's Party, was convicted in 2002 for publishing material that appeared to suggest that there is a link between a multiethnic society and rape, violence and forced marriages. Jussi Halla-aho, a Finns Party MEP, was convicted in 2012 after writing a 2008 blog entry which claimed that Islam "reveres paedophilia". However, Syed Kamall, the ECR's chairman, who is a practising Muslim, defended the new members.

Following the election, British Conservative MEP Sajjad Karim was the group's candidate for President of the European Parliament.

On 8 March 2016, the bureau of the ECR Group began motions to exclude the two remaining MEPs of the Alternative for Germany (AfD) from their group due to the AfD's links with the far-right Freedom Party of Austria (FPÖ) and controversial remarks about immigration, inviting the MEPs to voluntarily leave the group by 31 March, with a motion of exclusion to be tabled on 12 April otherwise.

Changes in membership 2014–2019
On 2 October 2014, the leader of the Slovak party Freedom and Solidarity (SaS), Richard Sulik, left the ALDE group to join the ECR, and was formally accepted six days later.
In November 2014, the sole Croatian member of the group, Ruža Tomašić, left the party she founded, Croatian Party of Rights dr. Ante Starčević, to lead a new party, the Croatian Conservative Party.
On 24 January 2015, Amjad Bashir, the UKIP MEP for Yorkshire and the Humber, changed affiliation to the Conservative Party and subsequently joined the ECR.
On 18 May 2015, Raffaele Fitto, formerly of Italian party Forza Italia and EPP group member, joined the ECR group: forming a party called the Conservatives and Reformists after the ECR.
On 7 July 2015, Remo Sernagiotto left the EPP to join the ECR.
On 27 October 2015, Monica Macovei, from M10 political party left the EPP to join the ECR.
On 8 March 2016, Eleni Theocharous of the Cypriot Democratic Rally was admitted to the group from the EPP.
On 5 October 2016, Timothy Kirkhope was forced to quit after being created a life peer in the UK House of Lords, and thus becoming ineligible to continue serving in the European Parliament. His seat was succeeded by John Procter.
On 3 July 2018, Peter Lundgren and Kristina Winberg, from Sweden Democrats left EFDD group to join ECR group.
On 17 December 2018, Stefano Maullu left the EPP group to join the ECR group after his defection from Forza Italia to the Brothers of Italy.

2019 European Parliament elections and shift to the right
Prior to the 2019 elections, the Sweden Democrats (SD) and Brothers of Italy joined the ECR group, while Forum for Democracy (FvD) and Debout la France pledged to do so after the elections should they win seats.

Two ECR member parties, the Danish People's Party and the Finns Party, announced their intention to form a new group called the European Alliance for People and Nations with Alternative for Germany and Italy's League following the 2019 elections which was subsequently named Identity and Democracy.

During the 2019 elections the British Conservative Party sustained losses, including that of former ECR chairman Syed Kamall. The ECR also saw its total number of MEPs reduced to 62 MEPs and was overtaken in number by Identity and Democracy, the other predominant eurosceptic grouping. However, the FvD and the new Spanish Vox party gained seats for the first time and were formally admitted into the group.

Following the election, the group named Raffaele Fitto and Ryszard Legutko as new joint chairmen.

Changes in membership 2019–present
The Dutch Christian Union (CU) quit the group following the 2019 elections and switched to the European People's Party group with the CU's sole MEP Peter van Dalen protesting that the ECR was moving too far to the right with the inclusion of parties like Forum for Democracy, Vox and the Sweden Democrats. The fellow Dutch Reformed Political Party opted to remain the group, signalling the end of an alliance the CU and Reformed party had during European elections.

On 31 January 2020, the remaining British Conservative Party MEPs resigned from the group following the completion of the withdrawal of the United Kingdom from the European Union.

In May 2020, Cristian Terheș announced he was joining the ECR group as an MEP for the Romanian Christian Democratic National Peasants' Party (which had previously been expelled from the European People's Party group) having initially been elected for the Social Democratic Party.

In 2020, all MEPs of the Forum for Democracy party resigned to sit as independents before co-founding a new party, JA21. In 2022, Forum for Democracy switched its affiliation to the Identity and Democracy group.

Conservatives and Reformists Summit 
ECR Group members participated in two summits organised by the ECR Party (then called the Alliance of Conservatives and Reformists in Europe):
 2015 Conservatives and Reformists Summit: Tunis (Tunisia)
 2016 Conservatives and Reformists Summit: Antalya (Turkey)

Membership

Ninth European Parliament 
Following the 2019 election, the ECR won 61 seats. The Finns Party and the Danish People's Party agreed to leave the group and join the far-right Identity and Democracy after the election. After those losses, four parties joined the group: the Spanish Vox, the Family Party of Germany, Greek Solution and the Dutch Forum for Democracy.

ECR currently has 61 Members of the European Parliament from 15 countries.

Eighth European Parliament
Following the 2014 election, members from twelve new parties joined. Additional parties were admitted during the course of the Eighth European Parliament, such as the Slovak Freedom and Solidarity party and the Italian Direzione Italia. Alternative for Germany was initially admitted, but expelled in April 2016.

In 2019 the ECR had 77 Members of the European Parliament, from twenty-three parties across eighteen countries. The ECR drew the majority of its MEPs from northern and central Europe.

Seventh European Parliament
Originally, it had been announced on 22 June 2009 that Hannu Takkula, MEP for the Finnish Centre Party (an Alliance of Liberals and Democrats for Europe member party) would also be a member of ECR (with his two party colleagues remaining in ALDE), but he reversed this decision two days later.

The group membership was reduced to 54 when Edward McMillan-Scott was expelled from the group in July 2009. It increased to 55 again when Anna Rosbach joined the group in March 2011. UKIP MEP David Campbell Bannerman rejoined the Conservative Party in May 2011, taking the group's tally to 56: one larger than The Greens–European Free Alliance – an advantage that disappeared in June 2011. Anthea McIntyre was confirmed as the ECR's 57th MEP on 1 December 2011. United Poland, which had been founded by four defectors from Law and Justice – Zbigniew Ziobro, Tadeusz Cymański, Jacek Kurski, and Jacek Włosowicz – left the ECR for Europe of Freedom and Democracy (EFD) on 26 December 2011. In March 2012, Conservative Roger Helmer defected to the UK Independence Party (UKIP) and also joined EFD; Marta Andreasen moved in the opposite direction, joining the Conservatives and the ECR from UKIP and the EFD group, in February 2013.  In October 2012, Cristiana Muscardini joined the ECR, when she left Future and Freedom to found the Conservatives and Social Reformers. In April 2013, the ECR was joined by fellow Italian Susy De Martini, an independent who was formerly a member of The People of Freedom. The newly elected Croatian MEP Ruža Tomašić of the Croatian Party of Rights joined the group when Croatia joined the EU in July 2013. In November 2013, Poland Comes First dissolved itself, with three of its members joining the new Poland Together, which was also joined by Artur Zasada from the EPP: taking the group's number of MEPs to 57. In 2014, Mirosław Piotrowski rejoined Law and Justice, and sought re-election in 2014 under that party's banner.

MEPs

9th European Parliament

8th European Parliament

Leadership

Chairman
The ECR currently is led by two Co-Chairmen, Ryszard Legutko and Raffaele Fitto.

There have been five previous Chairmen of the European Conservatives and Reformists group:

Group Bureau

As of 12 July 2019:

Cohesion 
According to calculations by Vote Watch Europe, the ECR group had a cohesion rate of 86.65% in parliamentary votes during the 7th session (2009–14). This is slightly lower than in the four pro-European groups, but higher than in the European United Left–Nordic Green Left (GUE/NGL) and far higher than in the Europe of Freedom and Democracy (EFD) groups. Internal cohesion was highest in votes on constitutional and inter-institutional affairs (94.79%), international trade, and industry, research & energy. The greatest divergence within the group was in decisions on regional development (70.53% cohesion), agriculture, and development (cooperation). The parties that were most loyal to the group (meaning that they voted with the majority of ECR members the most often) were the UK Conservatives (97.51%), the Ulster Unionist Party and the Czech Civic Democratic Party. The members who deviated from the ECR majority the most often were the individual MEPs Andreasen from the UK (who had switched over from EFD group only in 2013; 61.20% loyalty), Muscardini from Italy, and Rosbach (who had crossed over from EFD in 2011).

See also 
 European Conservatives, an earlier political group of Conservatives in the European Parliament
 European Conservatives and Reformists Group Executive
 Movement for European Reform

References

External links

 European Conservatives and Reformists official website
 Members of the group
 ConservativeHome (2009-06-22): The deal is done: Details of the new Conservative grouping in the European Parliament

 
European Parliament party groups
Political parties established in 2009
Conservatism in Europe
Organisations associated with the Conservative Party (UK)